The 2012 Open d'Orléans was a professional tennis tournament played on hard courts. It was the eighth edition of the tournament which was part of the 2012 ATP Challenger Tour. It took place in Orléans, France between 24 and 30 September 2012.

Singles main-draw entrants

Seeds

 1 Rankings are as of September 17, 2012.

Other entrants
The following players received wildcards into the singles main draw:
  Ernests Gulbis
  Philipp Kohlschreiber
  Adrian Mannarino
  Albano Olivetti

The following players received entry as a special exempt into the singles main draw:
  Steve Johnson
  Dmitry Tursunov

The following players received entry from the qualifying draw:
  Antoine Escoffier
  Nils Langer
  Fabrice Martin
  Nicolas Renavand

Champions

Singles

 David Goffin def.  Ruben Bemelmans, 6–4, 3–6, 6–3

Doubles

 Lukáš Dlouhý /  Gilles Müller def.  Xavier Malisse /  Ken Skupski, 6–2, 6–7(5–7), [10–7]

External links
Official Website